Philema Lemaire (7 July 1856 in Verberie, Oise, France – 6 May 1932 in Neuilly-Sur-Seine, Hauts-de-Seine, France) was a French politician.

He was Governor General of Pondicherry in Second French Colonial Empire. Philema Lemaire, a member of Arthur Blocher's congregation, was also elected deputy in the French National Assembly (1907–14).

References

French colonial governors and administrators
Governors of French India
People of the French Third Republic
1856 births
1932 deaths
People from Oise